Boeunsan is the name of a mountain in Gangjin county, Jeollanam-do province, South Korea.  Its highest point is at Udubong (우두봉), 439 meters.

Boeunsan is north of Gangjin-eup in Gangjin county, and runs parallel to National Route 2.

Boeunsan is a popular area for hiking among locals in Gangjin.  There are three courses, the longest of which is roughly 6 km.  There are three Buddhist temples in the foothills, most notably Geumgoksa.  Additionally, there are sporadic springs and exercise areas along the trails.

See also
List of mountains in Korea

External links
Boeunsan, guide from Gangjin county site, in Korean
Boeunsan, from Jeollanam-do guide to natural springs, in Korean

Mountains of South Jeolla Province
Gangjin County
Mountains of South Korea